Martin Henry Dawson (6 August 1896 – 27 April 1945) was a Canadian researcher who made important contributions in the fields of infectious diseases.

Dawson was born in Truro, Nova Scotia, a grandson of John Barnhill Dickie and educated at Dalhousie University and McGill University. His research included studies on the transformation of pneumococci and on the biological variants of the streptococcus and other microorganisms. Dawson's studies on the nature and treatment of arthritis made him a recognized authority in this disorder.  He was a pioneer in penicillin therapy, and was the first in the world to prepare it and use it in human disease. This included the successful treatment of bacterial endocarditis with penicillin, and the use of gold salts in the treatment of rheumatoid arthritis.

Dawson became the first person in history to administer an antibiotic (penicillin) to a patient, on October 16, 1940.

Military career
After he had graduated Dalhousie University in Halifax with a BA in 1916 he started serving in the Canadian forces in the First World War. Pte. M. Henry Dawson was with No. 7 Stationary Hospital at La Harve, France.  He became a Capt. in the Nova Scotia Reg’t of Canadian Army Medical Corps. He was wounded in 1917 and again in 1918 and was awarded the Military Cross in 1917.

Career as a researcher

Following the war Dawson attended McGill University in Quebec and received his M.D. degree in 1923. After graduating in Medicine he worked at the Royal Victoria Hospital in Montreal. In 1926 he was appointed a National Research Fellow, assigned to the Rockefeller Institute in New York.

As a National Research Council fellow he worked with Oswald Avery at the Rockefeller Institute. Over Avery's strong objections, Dawson recreated Fred Griffith's discovery that a soluble substance from dead bacteria of one type can effect a repeatable and inheritable change in bacteria of another type – a process Dawson termed transformation in his six articles on the subject – in which he was the first person in history to put the substance to work in a test tube and even to partially extract it. The phrase stuck and eventually Avery along with Colin Munro MacLeod proved the substance was in fact DNA.

In 1929 Dawson became associated with the Presbyterian Hospital and the Department of Medicine at Columbia University.

In 1942 Dawson became the victim of myasthenia gravis, a chronic progressively disabling disease. He died in 1945 at Columbia University Medical Center.

Career
1916   B.A. Dalhousie University
1923   M.D. McGill University
1923   C.M. McGill University
1923-1924  Demonstrator in Pathology and Bacteriology, McGill University. Externe in Pathology, Royal Victoria Hospital.
1924-1925  Instructor in Pathology and Bacteriology, University of Louisville.
1925-1926  Assistant Resident Physician, Royal Victoria Hospital.
1926-1928  National Research Council Fellow in Medicine. Rockefeller Institute.
1928-1929  Assistant, Rockefeller Institute.
1929-1930  Associate in Medicine, College of Physicians and Surgeons.
1929-      Assistant Attending Physician, Presbyterian  Hospital.
1930-      Assistant Professor of Medicine, College of Physicians and Surgeons.

References

External links
Murray Matters | Vol. 10 #2

Canadian expatriate academics in the United States
Canadian medical researchers
Canadian microbiologists
Canadian people of Scottish descent
Dalhousie University alumni
Canadian molecular biologists
History of genetics
People from Truro, Nova Scotia
1896 births
1945 deaths
McGill University Faculty of Medicine alumni
Canadian expatriates in France